The Revolution Will Not Be Televised is a compilation album by American poet Gil Scott-Heron. It was released in 1974 by Flying Dutchman Records and titled after Scott-Heron's 1971 song of the same name.

Recordings 
The album features recordings previously featured on Scott-Heron's first three records for Flying Dutchman—Small Talk at 125th and Lenox (1970), Pieces of a Man (1971), and Free Will (1972), which were produced by jazz producer Bob Thiele. The music compiled incorporates funk, jazz, and proto-rap styles.

Release and reception

The Revolution Will Not Be Televised was released in 1974 and charted on Billboards Top Jazz Albums. It peaked at number 21 on October 12 of that year after spending five weeks on the chart. In a contemporary review, Ebony magazine's Phyl Garland called the album "mind-blowing" and said Scott-Heron "does not merely posture and pacify, but presses one to consider the uncomfortable truths of contemporary blackness."

Since then, The Revolution Will Not Be Televised has received positive reviews from publications such as The Washington Post and Los Angeles Daily News, which said "the roots of rap run deep through this superb retrospective". Village Voice critic Robert Christgau said the compilation abandons the homophobia that plagued Scott-Heron's 1970 debut Small Talk at 125th and Lenox in favor of songs that show artistic progress, including agitprop that sounds less arrogant but still committed and improved singing that reveals his compassion. In To the Break of Dawn: A Freestyle on the Hip Hop Aesthetic (2007), William Jelani Cobb said of its significance in hip hop music:

In the Encyclopedia of Popular Music (2002), writer Colin Larkin praised Scott-Heron's anger and passion in his spoken-word performances on "No Knock" and the title track. AllMusic's Alex Henderson recommended the album's "innovative R&B and spoken poetry" to listeners interested in "exploring his artistry for the first time".

Track listing

 Sides one and two were combined as tracks 1–11 on CD reissues.

Personnel

Musicians
 Ron Carter – bass
 Brian Jackson – piano
 Jerry Jemmott – bass
 Burt Jones – guitar
 Eddie Knowles – percussion
 Hubert Laws – alto saxophone, flute
 Pretty Purdie – drums
 Charlie Saunders – percussion
 Gil Scott-Heron – piano, vocals, songwriter
 David Spinozza – guitar

Production
 Carmine Coppola – reissue artwork
 Joe Lopes – remastering
 Bob Simpson – engineer
 Stephen Sulke – engineer
 Bob Thiele – producer, remastering

Charts
Billboard Music Charts (North America) – The Revolution Will Not Be Televised
1974: Top Jazz Albums – #21 (5 weeks)

Release history
Information regarding the release history of The Revolution Will Not Be Televised is adapted from Discogs.

Sampled appearances
The information regarding sampling of songs from The Revolution Will Not Be Televised is adapted from TheBreaks.com.

 "The Revolution Will Not Be Televised"
 Masta Ace – "Take a Look Around"
 Professor Griff – "Real African People 'Rap', Pt. 2"
 Queen Latifah – "The Evil That Men Do"
 Salt-N-Pepa – "Whatta Man Luvbug Remix 1"
 "Home Is Where the Hatred Is"
 Kanye West ft. Common – "My Way Home"
 "Pieces of a Man"
 KMD – "What a Niggy Know?"

References

Bibliography

External links
 

Gil Scott-Heron albums
Albums produced by Bob Thiele
1974 compilation albums
Soul compilation albums
Flying Dutchman Records compilation albums
Spoken word albums by American artists